Peter & the Wolf is a 1966 studio album by Jimmy Smith, with Oliver Nelson's big band. It is based on Sergei Prokofiev's Peter and the Wolf.

Reception
Scott Yanow of AllMusic stated:

Track listing
 "The Bird / The Duck / The Cat / The Grandfather / The Wolf / The Hunter / Peter" (Serge Prokofiev) – 4:09
 "Duck Theme /Jimmy and the Duck / Peter's Theme / Meal Time" (Oliver Nelson, Prokofiev) – 9:39
 "Elegy for a Duck" (Nelson) – 7:16
 "Cat in a Tree" (Nelson) – 5:21
 "Capture of the Wolf" (Nelson) – 1:14
 "Finale: Parade / Peter Plays Some Blues" (Nelson) – 4:45

Personnel

Musicians
 Jimmy Smith – organ
 Oliver Nelson – arranger, conductor
 Joe Newman, Ernie Royal, Richard Williams, Snooky Young – trumpet
 Phil Woods, Jerry Dodgion, Bob Ashton, Jerome Richardson, Danny Bank, Stan Webb – woodwinds
 Tony Studd – bass tuba
 Quentin Jackson, Dick Hixson, Britt Woodman, Tom McIntosh – trombone
 Willie Ruff, Jimmy Buffington – French horn
 Barry Galbraith, Billy Butler – guitar
 Richard Davis – bass
 Grady Tate – drums
 Harry Brewer, Bobby Rosengarden – percussion

Technical
 Creed Taylor – producer
 Val Valentin – director of engineering
 Rudy Van Gelder – engineer
 Acy R. Lehman – cover design
 Don Ornitz – photography
 Al "Jazzbo" Collins – liner notes

References

1966 albums
Jimmy Smith (musician) albums
Albums produced by Creed Taylor
Albums arranged by Oliver Nelson
Verve Records albums
Albums conducted by Oliver Nelson
Albums recorded at Van Gelder Studio